Jim Black (born 13 November 1943 in Airdrie, North Lanarkshire) is a retired Scottish association football player, who played as a defender for Airdrie, Hibernian and Stenhousemuir. He was part of the Hibs side that won the Scottish League Cup in 1972 and the Drybrough Cup twice. Black also played in the Scottish Cup Finals of 1972 and 1975.

In March 2016 Black was inaugurated into Airdrieonians Greatest XI, a poll conducted amongst Airdrie fans to find the greatest starting line up in the history of the club.

See also
 List of footballers in Scotland by number of league appearances (500+)

References

External links
 

1943 births
Living people
Footballers from Airdrie, North Lanarkshire
Scottish footballers
Association football defenders
Scottish Football League players
Hibernian F.C. players
Airdrieonians F.C. (1878) players
Stenhousemuir F.C. players
Scottish football managers
Stenhousemuir F.C. managers
Scottish Football League managers